The Racecourse of Achilles is a narrow strip of land north-west of Crimea and south of the mouth of the Dnieper in Ukraine, running nearly due west and cast. It is now divided into two parts called Tendra Spit and Dzharylhach. According to ancient legends Achilles pursued Iphigenia to this peninsula and there practised for his races.

The land was called Racecourse of Achilles because the hero celebrated his victory there with competitive games and also there he and his men routinely exercised when there was a respite from the fighting.

The Leuke island in the Black Sea, modern Snake island, was also called racecourse of Achilles.

References

External links 
 

Locations in Greek mythology
Greek mythology
Ancient Crimea
Achilles